Charlène Diantesa Banzuzi (born 23 August 1990), known as Charlène Diantesa, is a DR Congolese footballer who plays as a defender. She has been a member of the DR Congo women's national team.

International career
Diantesa capped for the DR Congo at senior level during the 2012 African Women's Championship.

See also
 List of Democratic Republic of the Congo women's international footballers

References

1990 births
Living people
Women's association football defenders
Democratic Republic of the Congo women's footballers
Democratic Republic of the Congo women's international footballers
21st-century Democratic Republic of the Congo people